Ōpaheke is a suburb of Auckland, in northern New Zealand. It is located to the south of Papakura, and 32 kilometres south of the Auckland CBD. The suburb is the southernmost part of the Auckland metropolitan area.

The name was altered to include a macron in 2019.

History
Ethnographer George Graham recorded that the name meant "Of Paheke", which suggests that it was named after a person called Paheke.

Ōpaheke became recognised as an independent suburb in 1989. The previous area was referred to as a small area of greater Papakura, but has now developed into a separate residential area.

The Ōpaheke area became part of Papakura District in the 1989 New Zealand local government reforms.

Since October 2010, after a review of the Royal Commission on Auckland Governance, the entire Auckland Region was be amalgamated into a single city authority. As well as the former Papakura District, all other territorial authorities have been abolished and the entire area has been dissolved into a single Auckland city council. The suburb of Ōpaheke has been in the Manurewa-Papakura Ward of the Auckland Council since.

Demographics

Ōpaheke had a population of 2,868 at the 2018 New Zealand census, an increase of 276 people (10.6%) since the 2013 census, and an increase of 315 people (12.3%) since the 2006 census. There were 903 households, comprising 1,398 males and 1,473 females, giving a sex ratio of 0.95 males per female. The median age was 33.7 years (compared with 37.4 years nationally), with 627 people (21.9%) aged under 15 years, 624 (21.8%) aged 15 to 29, 1,332 (46.4%) aged 30 to 64, and 285 (9.9%) aged 65 or older.

Ethnicities were 71.0% European/Pākehā, 24.5% Māori, 9.6% Pacific peoples, 11.3% Asian, and 2.8% other ethnicities. People may identify with more than one ethnicity.

The percentage of people born overseas was 22.8, compared with 27.1% nationally.

Although some people chose not to answer the census's question about religious affiliation, 49.5% had no religion, 35.8% were Christian, 1.6% had Māori religious beliefs, 2.1% were Hindu, 0.7% were Muslim, 0.7% were Buddhist and 3.6% had other religions.

Of those at least 15 years old, 429 (19.1%) people had a bachelor's or higher degree, and 405 (18.1%) people had no formal qualifications. The median income was $39,700, compared with $31,800 nationally. 465 people (20.7%) earned over $70,000 compared to 17.2% nationally. The employment status of those at least 15 was that 1,338 (59.7%) people were employed full-time, 252 (11.2%) were part-time, and 84 (3.7%) were unemployed.

Education

See also 

 Ōpaheke railway station

References

External links
Photographs of Opaheke held in Auckland Libraries' heritage collections.

Suburbs of Auckland
Populated places in the Auckland Region